Oilspot and Lipstick is a 1987 computer animated short film from Walt Disney Productions directed by Michael Cedeno. The short was released on June 28, 1987.

Synopsis 
An old, broken-down car sits on a mountain. Out of the trunk of this car comes a robot dog with glasses whose body was made, among other things, of cubes. The dog wakes up his partner, another robot dog, who has a high-heeled shoe and a pair of scissors for a head.  After touching a mountain of rubbish, a giant robot wakes up, chases the dogs and grabs the female dog with one hand to eat her. The robot dog throws his spanner at the giant robot's head. The wrench causes the robot to fall to the ground. Thus, the female robot falls into the suitcase of the car.

Credits

Staff 
 Director: Michael Cedeno
 Producer: Dave Inglish
 Creative Consultant: Burny Mattinson
 Story Development: Michael Cedeno, Bruce Morris, Gary Trousdale
 Original Concept: Lemuel Davis
 Music: Jay Ferguson
 Animators: Ruben A. Aquino, Michael Cedeno, Brian Clift, Anthony de Rosa, Jim Houston, Tina Price, M.J. Turner
 Drawing Effects Animators: Barry Cook
 Additional Animation: Jim Houston
 Layout Artist: Fred Cline
 Background Artist: Brian Sebern
 Video Editing: Bob Lambert, David Jones
 Film Editing: David F. Wolf
 Production Manager: M.J. Turner
 Technical Directors; Production/Animation: Tad Gielow
 Technical Directors; Compositing/Effects: Lemuel Davis, David B. Coons, Jim Houston
 CG Systems Management: Tad Gielow, Mark Kimball, M.J. Turner, Vahe Sarkissian
 Wavefront Consultant: John Grower
 Computer Production Hardware: Edge Computer Corporation
 Computer Production Hardware/Software for Animation Tests: Pixar, Inc.
 Computer Production Software: Wavefront Technologies

Premiere of the film
The short film was premiered at the SIGGRAPH conference, held in Anaheim, California. However, it was never released in cinemas.

References

External links 
 
 Oilspot and Lipstick Reunion

1987 short films
American computer-animated films
1987 computer-animated films
Animated films about dogs
Animated films about robots
1980s Disney animated short films
1980s English-language films